Red gum or redgum may refer to:

Plants
 Liquidambar styraciflua, sweetgum or redgum, a North American hardwood tree
 , red gum, a flowering plant in the genus Guibourtia

Eucalyptus and related
One of the several trees called red gum in Australia:
 Angophora costata, Sydney red gum
 Corymbia calophylla, red gum or marri, native to Western Australia
 Corymbia ficifolia, red-flowering gum
 Eucalyptus ammophila, sandplain red gum 
 Eucalyptus bancroftii, Bancroft's red gum
 Eucalyptus blakelyi, Blakely's red gum, forest red gum, white budded red gum or hill red gum
 Eucalyptus brassiana, Cape York red gum   
 Eucalyptus camaldulensis, river red gum
 Eucalyptus chloroclada, Baradine red gum
 Eucalyptus dealbata, hill red gum, tumble-down red gum 
 Eucalyptus dwyeri, Dwyer's red gum
 Eucalyptus glaucina, slaty red gum
 Eucalyptus lane-poolei, red-freckled gum   
 Eucalyptus macrorhyncha, red gum, red stringybark, Cannon's stringybark or Capertee stringybark
 Eucalyptus mannifera, red spotted gum
 Eucalyptus nandewarica, Eucalyptus flindersii, Eucalyptus gillenii, mallee red gum
 Eucalyptus parramattensis, Parramatta red gum
 Eucalyptus seeana, narrow-leaved red gum
 Eucalyptus tereticornis, red gum, forest red gum or red irongum 
 Eucalyptus vicina, Manara Hills red gum

Other uses
 Redgum, an Australian folk and political music band
 Big Red (gum), a cinnamon flavored chewing gum
 A resin derived from Xanthorrhoea species
 Kino (botany), a botanical gum produced by various trees and other plants